The 2013–14 NBA season was the Bucks' 46th season in the NBA. They finished with 15 wins and 67 losses, the worst record in the NBA. It was the Bucks' worst season record in franchise history, five fewer wins than their previous low-mark in 1993–94.

Key dates
 June 27: The 2013 NBA draft took place at the Barclays Center in Brooklyn, New York.
 July 1: 2013 NBA Free Agency begins.

Draft picks

Roster

Overview

Pre-season

|- style="background:#fcc;"
| 1
| October 8
| @ Cleveland
| 
| Stephen Graham (15)
| Sanders & Ridnour (5)
| Nate Wolters (3)
| Quicken Loans Arena9,022
| 0–1
|- style="background:#fcc;"
| 2
| October 10
| @ Minnesota
| 
| John Henson (16)
| Giannis Antetokounmpo (7)
| Mayo & Ridnour (4)
| The Pentagon3,250
| 0–2
|- style="background:#fcc;"
| 3
| October 12
| Charlotte
| 
| Caron Butler (18)
| John Henson (10)
| Brandon Knight (7)
| BMO Harris Bradley Center7,839
| 0–3
|- style="background:#fcc;"
| 4
| October 15
| @ Memphis
| 
| Brandon Knight (19)
| John Henson (12)
| Henson & Knight (4)
| FedExForum11,164
| 0–4
|- style="background:#fcc;"
| 5
| October 21
| @ Chicago
| 
| Gary Neal (14)
| John Henson (8)
| Middleton, Neal, Knight (2)
| United Center21,203
| 0–5
|- style="background:#cfc;"
| 6
| October 23
| New York
| 
| Caron Butler (24)
| Zaza Pachulia (9)
| Luke Ridnour (11)
| Resch Center5,609
| 1–5
|- style="background:#cfc;"
| 7
| October 25
| Toronto
| 
| Khris Middleton (8)
| Zaza Pachulia (2)
| John Henson (2)
| BMO Harris Bradley Center
| 2–5

Regular season

Game log

|- style="background:#fcc;"
| 1
| October 30
| @ New York
| 
| Gary Neal (16)
| Zaza Pachulia (11)
| Gary Neal (5)
| Madison Square Garden19,812
| 0–1

|- style="background:#cfc;"
| 2
| November 1
| @ Boston
| 
| Zaza Pachulia (20)
| John Henson & Pachulia (9)
| Nate Wolters (6)
| TD Garden18,624
| 1–1
|- style="background:#fcc;"
| 3
| November 2
| Toronto
| 
| O. J. Mayo (16)
| Butler & Mayo (6)
| Nate Wolters (10)
| BMO Harris Bradley Center16,046
| 1–2
|- style="background:#cfc;"
| 4
| November 6
| Cleveland
| 
| O. J. Mayo (28)
| Henson & Pachulia (9)
| Zaza Pachulia (7)
| BMO Harris Bradley Center14,340
| 2–2
|- style="background:#fcc;"
| 5
| November 9
| Dallas
| 
| O. J. Mayo (28)
| Caron Butler (13)
| Nate Wolters (5)
| BMO Harris Bradley Center16,448
| 2–3
|- style="background:#fcc;"
| 6
| November 12
| @ Miami
| 
| Henson & Neal (18)
| Khris Middleton (7)
| Brandon Knight (6)
| American Airlines Arena19,600
| 2–4
|- style="background:#fcc;"
| 7
| November 13
| @ Orlando
| 
| O. J. Mayo (25)
| John Henson (9)
| Khris Middleton (4)
| Amway Center13,588
| 2–5
|- style="background:#fcc;"
| 8
| November 15
| @ Indiana
| 
| O. J. Mayo (20)
| Zaza Pachulia (11)
| Nate Wolters (5)
| Bankers Life Fieldhouse16,202
| 2–6
|- style="background:#fcc;"
| 9
| November 16
| Oklahoma City
| 
| O. J. Mayo (22)
| Zaza Pachulia (13)
| Luke Ridnour (5)
| BMO Harris Bradley Center15,984
| 2–7
|- style="background:#fcc;"
| 10
| November 20
| Portland
| 
| Luke Ridnour (13)
| Zaza Pachulia (8)
| Luke Ridnour (5)
| BMO Harris Bradley Center11,789
| 2–8
|- style="background:#fcc;"
| 11
| November 22
| @ Philadelphia
| 
| Caron Butler (38)
| Caron Butler (8)
| Luke Ridnour (9)
| Wells Fargo Center13,588
| 2–9
|- style="background:#fcc;"
| 12
| November 23
| Charlotte
| 
| Khris Middleton (20)
| John Henson (9)
| Brandon Knight (7)
| BMO Harris Bradley Center14,871
| 2–10
|- style="background:#fcc;"
| 13
| November 25
| @ Detroit
| 
| John Henson (15)
| John Henson (7)
| Brandon Knight (4)
| Palace of Auburn Hills12,150
| 2–11
|- style="background:#fcc;"
| 14
| November 27
| Washington
| 
| O. J. Mayo (21)
| Zaza Pachulia (10)
| Brandon Knight (5)
| BMO Harris Bradley Center11,584
| 2–12
|- style="background:#fcc;"
| 15
| November 29
| @ Charlotte
| 
| Brandon Knight (17)
| Ekpe Udoh (6)
| Khris Middleton (3)
| Time Warner Cable Arena15,081
| 2–13
|- style="background:#cfc;"
| 16
| November 30
| Boston
| 
| O. J. Mayo (22)
| John Henson (13)
| Brandon Knight (8)
| BMO Harris Bradley Center15,471
| 3–13

|- style="background:#fcc;"
| 17
| December 3
| @ Boston
| 
| O. J. Mayo (19)
| Ersan İlyasova (7)
| Brandon Knight (6)
| TD Garden16,649
| 3–14
|- style="background:#fcc;"
| 18
| December 4
| Detroit
| 
| Ersan İlyasova (22)
| Ersan İlyasova (10)
| Luke Ridnour (8)
| BMO Harris Bradley Center12,835
| 3–15
|- style="background:#cfc;"
| 19
| December 6
| @ Washington
| 
| Khris Middleton (29)
| John Henson (17)
| Brandon Knight (6)
| Verizon Center18,194
| 4–15
|- style="background:#fcc;"
| 20
| December 7
| Brooklyn
| 
| O. J. Mayo (22)
| John Henson (7)
| O. J. Mayo (5)
| BMO Harris Bradley Center14,963
| 4–16
|- style="background:#cfc;"
| 21
| December 10
| @ Chicago
| 
| John Henson (25)
| John Henson (14)
| O. J. Mayo (7)
| United Center21,303
| 5–16
|- style="background:#fcc;"
| 22
| December 11
| San Antonio
| 
| Nate Wolters (18)
| John Henson (8)
| Nate Wolters (7)
| BMO Harris Bradley Center11,087
| 5–17
|- style="background:#fcc;"
| 23
| December 13
| Chicago
| 
| Gary Neal (17)
| Giannis Antetokounmpo (9)
| Brandon Knight (4)
| BMO Harris Bradley Center15,219
| 5–18
|- style="background:#fcc;"
| 24
| December 14
| @ Dallas
| 
| John Henson (18)
| John Henson (13)
| Giannis Antetokounmpo (4)
| American Airlines Center19,973
| 5–19
|- style="background:#fcc;"
| 25
| December 18
| New York
| 
| Brandon Knight (36)
| John Henson (14)
| Brandon Knight (3)
| BMO Harris Bradley Center11,869
| 5–20
|- style="background:#fcc;"
| 26
| December 20
| @ Cleveland
| 
| O. J. Mayo (20)
| Brandon Knight (14)
| Brandon Knight (8)
| Quicken Loans Arena19,058
| 5–21
|- style="background:#cfc;"
| 27
| December 21
| Philadelphia
| 
| Khris Middleton (27)
| Caron Butler (13)
| Brandon Knight (8)
| BMO Harris Bradley Center14,541
| 6–21
|- style="background:#fcc;"
| 28
| December 23
| @ Charlotte
| 
| Brandon Knight (26)
| Brandon Knight (8)
| Brandon Knight (14)
| Time Warner Cable Arena13,534
| 6–22
|- style="background:#fcc;"
| 29
| December 27
| @ Brooklyn
| 
| Giannis Antetokounmpo (16)
| Giannis Antetokounmpo (10)
| Brandon Knight, Luke Ridnour (5)
| Barclays Center17,732
| 6–23
|- style="background:#fcc;"
| 30
| December 28
| Minnesota
| 
| Khris Middleton (23)
| Larry Sanders (10)
| Brandon Knight (5)
| BMO Harris Bradley Center14,971
| 6–24
|- style="background:#cfc;"
| 31
| December 31
| @ L.A. Lakers
| 
| Brandon Knight (37)
| Ersan İlyasova (12)
| Larry Sanders (5)
| Staples Center18,997
| 7–24

|- style="background:#fcc;"
| 32
| January 2
| @ Utah
| 
| Larry Sanders (16)
| Larry Sanders (8)
| Luke Ridnour (8)
| EnergySolutions Arena16,012
| 7–25
|- style="background:#fcc;"
| 33
| January 4
| @ Phoenix
| 
| Brandon Knight (25)
| Khris Middleton (8)
| Brandon Knight (8)
| US Airways Center14,344
| 7–26
|- style="background:#fcc;"
| 34
| January 7
| Golden State
| 
| Ersan İlyasova (20)
| Ersan İlyasova (6)
| Giannis Antetokounmpo (5)
| BMO Harris Bradley Center11,739
| 7–27
|- style="background:#fcc;"
| 35
| January 10
| Chicago
| 
| O. J. Mayo (16)
| Larry Sanders (9)
| Luke Ridnour (8)
| BMO Harris Bradley Center15,148
| 7–28
|- style="background:#fcc;"
| 36
| January 11
| @ Oklahoma City
| 
| O. J. Mayo (16)
| Giannis Antetokounmpo (11)
| Giannis Antetokounmpo (5)
| Chesapeake Energy Arena18,203
| 7–29
|- style="background:#fcc;"
| 37
| January 13
| @ Toronto
| 
| Ersan İlyasova (29)
| Ersan İlyasova (9)
| Luke Ridnour (7)
| Air Canada Centre15,819
| 7–30
|- style="background:#fcc;"
| 38
| January 15
| Memphis
| 
| Brandon Knight (27)
| Ersan İlyasova (13)
| Luke Ridnour (9)
| BMO Harris Bradley Center11,379
| 7–31
|- style="background:#fcc;"
| 39
| January 18
| @ Houston
| 
| Brandon Knight (26)
| John Henson (15)
| Brandon Knight (7)
| Toyota Center18,082
| 7–32
|- style="background:#fcc;"
| 40
| January 19
| @ San Antonio
| 
| Brandon Knight (21)
| John Henson (11)
| Luke Ridnour (3)
| AT&T Center18,096
| 7–33
|- style="background:#cfc;"
| 41
| January 22
| Detroit
| 
| Caron Butler (30)
| Miroslav Raduljica (8)
| Brandon Knight (9)
| BMO Harris Bradley Center11,266
| 8–33
|- style="background:#fcc;"
| 42
| January 24
| @ Cleveland
| 
| Khris Middleton (13)
| Giannis Antetokounmpo (7)
| O. J. Mayo (6)
| Quicken Loans Arena17,147
| 8–34
|- style="background:#fcc;"
| 43
| January 25
| Atlanta
| 
| Brandon Knight (27)
| Ersan İlyasova (13)
| Brandon Knight (5)
| BMO Harris Bradley Center15,879
| 8–35
|- style="background:#fcc;"
| 44
| January 27
| L.A. Clippers
| 
| Ersan İlyasova (16)
| Ilyasova & Henson (8)
| Brandon Knight (7)
| BMO Harris Bradley Center11,126
| 8–36
|- style="background:#fcc;"
| 45
| January 29
| Phoenix
| 
| Ersan İlyasova (27)
| Larry Sanders (9)
| Brandon Knight (8)
| BMO Harris Bradley Center11,175
| 8–37
|- style="background:#fcc;"
| 46
| January 31
| @ Orlando
| 
| Caron Butler (20)
| Larry Sanders (9)
| Nate Wolters (9)
| Amway Center17,292
| 8–38

|- style="background:#fcc;"
| 47
| February 1
| @ Memphis
| 
| Brandon Knight (23)
| Ersan İlyasova (13)
| Brandon Knight (7)
| FedExForum17,017
| 8–39
|- style="background:#cfc;"
| 48
| February 3
| New York
| 
| Brandon Knight (25)
| Larry Sanders (11)
| Brandon Knight (7)
| BMO Harris Bradley Center11,147
| 9–39
|- style="background:#fcc;"
| 49
| February 5
| @ Denver
| 
| Sanders & Middleton (25)
| Larry Sanders (15)
| Brandon Knight (8)
| Pepsi Center15,122
| 9–40
|- style="background:#fcc;"
| 50
| February 8
| Houston
| 
| Brandon Knight (23)
| Henson & Pachulia (10)
| Khris Middleton (8)
| BMO Harris Bradley Center15,923
| 9–41
|- style="background:#fcc;"
| 51
| February 10
| Boston
| 
| Brandon Knight (22)
| Zaza Pachulia (8)
| Knight & Pachulia (4)
| BMO Harris Bradley Center11,016
| 9–42
|- style="background:#fcc;"
| 52
| February 12
| New Orleans
| 
| Brandon Knight (22)
| Ersan İlyasova (9)
| Brandon Knight (9)
| BMO Harris Bradley Center11,012
| 9–43
|- align="center"
|colspan="9" bgcolor="#bbcaff"|All-Star Break
|- style="background:#cfc;"
| 53
| February 18
| Orlando
| 
| Caron Butler (21)
| John Henson (10)
| Nate Wolters (8)
| BMO Harris Bradley Center11,106
| 10–43
|- style="background:#fcc;"
| 54
| February 20
| Denver
| 
| Caron Butler (17)
| Ersan İlyasova (11)
| Nate Wolters (5)
| BMO Harris Bradley Center11,186
| 10–44
|- style="background:#fcc;"
| 55
| February 22
| Indiana
| 
| Brandon Knight (30)
| Jeff Adrien (11)
| Brandon Knight (8)
| BMO Harris Bradley Center17,165
| 10–45
|- style="background:#cfc;"
| 56
| February 24
| @ Philadelphia
| 
| O. J. Mayo (25)
| Jeff Adrien (10)
| Ramon Sessions (5)
| Wells Fargo Center12,216
| 11–45
|- style="background:#fcc;"
| 57
| February 27
| @ Indiana
| 
| Brandon Knight (23)
| Ersan İlyasova (11)
| Knight & Sessions (5)
| Bankers Life Fieldhouse17,892
| 11–46

|- style="background:#fcc;"
| 58
| March 1
| Brooklyn
| 
| Middleton & Sessions (16)
| Ersan İlyasova (11)
| Brandon Knight (5)
| BMO Harris Bradley Center14,081
| 11–47
|- style="background:#cfc;"
| 59
| March 3
| Utah
| 
| Ersan İlyasova (31)
| Jeff Adrien (11)
| Henson, Wolters & Knight (5)
| BMO Harris Bradley Center10,022
| 12–47
|- style="background:#fcc;"
| 60
| March 5
| Sacramento
| 
| Brandon Knight (25)
| John Henson (7)
| Brandon Knight (6)
| BMO Harris Bradley Center11,079
| 12–48
|- style="background:#fcc;"
| 61
| March 7
| @ New Orleans
| 
| Khris Middleton (25)
| Jeff Adrien (10)
| Brandon Knight (5)
| Smoothie King Center16,061
| 12–49
|- style="background:#fcc;"
| 62
| March 8
| Washington
| 
| Brandon Knight (25)
| Ilyasova & Adrien (8)
| Nate Wolters (4)
| BMO Harris Bradley Center14,839
| 12–50
|- style="background:#cfc;"
| 63
| March 10
| Orlando
| 
| Brandon Knight (24)
| Ersan İlyasova (11)
| Ramon Sessions (8)
| BMO Harris Bradley Center10,114
| 13–50
|- style="background:#fcc;"
| 64
| March 11
| @ Minnesota
| 
| Brandon Knight (21)
| John Henson (8)
| Zaza Pachulia (10)
| Target Center12,473
| 13–51
|- style="background:#fcc;"
| 65
| March 13
| @ Atlanta
| 
| Ersan İlyasova (22)
| Ersan İlyasova (10)
| Giannis Antetokounmpo (5)
| Philips Arena12,554
| 13–52
|- style="background:#fcc;"
| 66
| March 15
| @ New York
| 
| Nate Wolters (15)
| Jeff Adrien (7)
| Pachulia & Sessions (4)
| Madison Square Garden19,812
| 13–53
|- style="background:#fcc;"
| 67
| March 16
| Charlotte
| 
| Brandon Knight (21)
| Zaza Pachulia (9)
| Brandon Knight (7)
| BMO Harris Bradley Center14,536
| 13–54
|- style="background:#fcc;"
| 68
| March 18
| @ Portland
| 
| Brandon Knight (24)
| Zaza Pachulia (13)
| Nate Wolters (6)
| Moda Center19,572
| 13–55
|- style="background:#fcc;"
| 69
| March 20
| @ Golden State
| 
| Brandon Knight (27)
| Giannis Antetokounmpo  (8)
| Brandon Knight (6)
| Oracle Arena19,596
| 13–56
|- style="background:#fcc;"
| 70
| March 23
| @ Sacramento
| 
| O. J. Mayo (21)
| Giannis Antetokounmpo (6)
| Brandon Knight (7)
| Sleep Train Arena16,341
| 13–57
|- style="background:#fcc;"
| 71
| March 24
| @ L.A. Clippers
| 
| Ramon Sessions (28)
| Adrien & Henson (7)
| Zaza Pachulia (8)
| Staples Center19,060
| 13–58
|- style="background:#cfc;"
| 72
| March 27
| L.A. Lakers
| 
| Brandon Knight (30)
| Jeff Adrien (9)
| Ramon Sessions (5)
| BMO Harris Bradley Center15,439
| 14–58
|- style="background:#fcc;"
| 73
| March 29
| Miami
| 
| Ramon Sessions (15)
| John Henson (10)
| Brandon Knight (5)
| BMO Harris Bradley Center17,986
| 14–59
|- style="background:#fcc;"
| 74
| March 31
| @ Detroit
| 
| Brandon Knight (25)
| Zaza Pachulia (13)
| Ramon Sessions (11)
| Palace of Auburn Hills13,062
| 14–60

|- style="background:#fcc;"
| 75
| April 2
| @ Miami
| 
| Ramon Sessions (19)
| Zaza Pachulia (16)
| Ramon Sessions (6)
| American Airlines Arena19,609
| 14–61
|- style="background:#fcc;"
| 76
| April 4
| @ Chicago
| 
| Brandon Knight (22)
| Pachulia & Adrien (9)
| Giannis Antetokounmpo (5)
| United Center21,996
| 14–62
|- style="background:#fcc;"
| 77
| April 5
| Toronto
| 
| John Henson (23)
| Jeff Adrien (12)
| Ramon Sessions (10)
| BMO Harris Bradley Center16,310
| 14–63
|- style="background:#fcc;"
| 78
| April 9
| Indiana
| 
| Brandon Knight (25)
| Jeff Adrien (17)
| Brandon Knight (10)
| BMO Harris Bradley Center13,139
| 14–64
|- style="background:#cfc;"
| 79
| April 11
| Cleveland
| 
| Brandon Knight (24)
| Jeff Adrien (9)
| Ramon Sessions (7)
| BMO Harris Bradley Center13,126
| 15–64
|- style="background:#fcc;"
| 80
| April 12
| @ Washington
| 
| Middleton & Sessions (20)
| Jeff Adrien (10)
| Ramon Sessions (8)
| Verizon Center17,278
| 15–65
|- style="background:#fcc;"
| 81
| April 14
| @ Toronto
| 
| Ramon Sessions (21)
| Jeff Adrien (9)
| Ramon Sessions (5)
| Air Canada Centre18,821
| 15–66
|- style="background:#fcc;"
| 82
| April 16
| Atlanta
| 
| Brandon Knight (31)
| Khris Middleton (7)
| Ramon Sessions (6)
| BMO Harris Bradley Center13,111
| 15–67

Standings

Transactions

Trades

Free agents

Milwaukee
Milwaukee Bucks seasons
Milwaukee Bucks
Milwaukee Bucks